The Great Britain men's national volleyball team is the team representing Great Britain in volleyball competitions. The Great Britain Volleyball programme team was resumed in 2006 following an agreement of the FIVB to permit the separate Home Nations of England, Scotland, Wales and Northern Ireland to compete together for the 2012 Summer Olympics and 2012 Summer Paralympics.

Indoor 
The men's team were ranked 29th in the FIVB world ranking as of 22 July 2013.

Seasons

2008 
European League (Netherlands, Slovakia, Greece & Portugal)

2009 
1st Round World Championship Qualifiers (Belarus & Israel)

European League (Spain, Turkey & Croatia)

2010 
1st Round European Championship (Azerbaijan)

2nd Round European Championship Qualifiers (Latvia, Finland & Greece)

European League (Spain, Romania, Slovakia)

2011 
European League (Croatia, Belgium & Slovenia)

Olympic Test Event – Earls Court (London) 20 – 24 July 2011

2012 
1st Round European Championships (Albania)

Olympic Games – Earls Court (London) 29 July – 6 August 2012

2nd Round European Championships Qualifiers (Belarus, Turkey & Portugal)

Beach

Current roster

Sitting 
The men's sitting volleyball team finished in Division B 5th place after the Oklahoma 2010 World Championships.
After competing in the ECVD Continental Cup 2011, the men's team finished in 7th place.

References

External links 
 British Volleyball Federation official website 

GB Men
V
Volleyball in the United Kingdom